The Scottish Bulletin of Evangelical Theology is an academic journal published by the Scottish Evangelical Theology Society in association with Highland Theological College. It was established in 1983, and is published twice a year. The current editor is David Reimer.

References

External links
Online archives

Academic journals associated with universities and colleges
Academic journals associated with learned and professional societies
Protestant studies journals
Publications established in 1983
Biannual journals